Jimmy Akena Obote (born September 25, 1967) is a Uganda politician, and the son of Militon Obote and Miria Obote. Akena is a Member of Parliament representing Lira Municipality.

Early life 
Jimmy Akena Obote was born on September 25, 1967 at Mulago Hospital to former Ugandan President and the Uganda People's Congress founder Militon Obote and his wife Maria is a Ugandan politician and Member of Parliament representing Lira Municipality

Career 

During the first coup d'etat of Idi Amin, Akena spent his first five years in exile in Tanzania from 1971 to 1980.

Jimmy Akena Obote contested for Lira municipality Member of Parliament in 2006 immediately after his return from exile in 2005 under the flag of UPC which is a political party founded by his late father and won the elections that year. Since then he continued to retain the position in 2011,2016 and the resent elections of 2021.

References 

Living people
1967 births